A literary element, or narrative element, or element of literature is an essential characteristic of all works of written and spoken narrative fiction. Literary elements include plot, theme, character and tone. In contrast, literary techniques are non-universal features of literature and include figurative language, irony, and foreshadowing.

Purpose
Literary elements aid in the discussion and understanding of works of literature as basic categories of critical analysis; literary elements could be said to be produced by the readers of a work just as much as they are produced by its author. For the most part, they are popular concepts that are not limited to any particular branch of literary criticism, although they are most closely associated with the formalist method of professional literary criticism. There is no official definition or fixed list of terms of literary elements; however, they are a common feature of literary education at the primary and secondary level, and a set of terms similar to the one below often appears in institutional student evaluation. For instance, the New York State Comprehensive English Regents Exam requires that students use and discuss literary elements relating to specific works in each of the three essays.

Terms

Notes

References
 
 
 
 
 
 

Writing
Element